The Toyota 86 Racing Series is an Australian motor racing competition for Toyota 86 cars. It was first contested in 2016. The series has been sanctioned by the Confederation of Australian Motor Sport (CAMS) as an Authorised Series and Supercars as an Promoter.

Series winners

References